Augusta Highway is the part of Australia's ring route (Highway 1) located in South Australia between Port Wakefield and Port Augusta.

Route
Augusta Highway starts at the intersection with Eyre and Stuart Highways in Port Augusta West, then crosses the northern section of Spencer Gulf into central Port Augusta. It continues in a southerly direction as a single-carriageway highway with occasional overtaking lanes past Port Germein, Port Pirie, Crystal Brook and through Snowtown until it eventually meets Copper Coast Highway just north of Port Wakefield, where it continues south as Port Wakefield Highway.

History
It was named Augusta Highway in 2011, and was formerly known simply as Highway One (and also as Princes Highway, despite not being continuous to Princes Highway in the southeast of the state). When a Highway Naming Committee was formed around 1999, there were proposals for the highway to become part of Eyre Highway, or named Wakefield Highway.

Upgrades
Following the 2018 South Australian state election, upgrades were announced for both ends of the Augusta Highway. At the northern end, the Joy Baluch AM Bridge across Spencer Gulf at Port Augusta is to be duplicated to improve safety for both local and highway traffic. At the southern end, the contract for detailed design and construction of the duplication of the highway through Port Wakefield and a grade-separated intersection with the Copper Coast Highway was let in March 2020. Both projects were contracted to the Port Wakefield to Port Augusta Alliance (a consortium of CPB Contractors, Aurecon and GHD Group), with the government announcing an overpass for the intersection with Copper Coast Highway in 2021. Construction on both projects commenced in late 2020, with completion expected in 2022; the overpass to Copper Coast Highway opened in December 2021, four months ahead of schedule.

As finishing works were continuing around Port Wakefield, a new project started to duplicate the highway from the Copper Coast Highway to the southern side of Lochiel.

Major intersections

References

External links

Highways in South Australia
Highway 1 (Australia)